Benjamin Joseph "BJ" Franquez Cruz  (born March 3, 1951) is an Chamorro lawyer, jurist, and politician who served as the Speaker of the 34th Guam Legislature from 2017 to 2018 and as Vice Speaker from 2009 to 2017. A member of the Democratic Party, he previously served in the Guam Legislature from 2005 to 2007 and again from 2008 to 2018. He was Chief Justice of the Guam Supreme Court from 1999 to 2001. In September 2018, Cruz was elected to serve as Public Auditor of Guam.

Early life and education
His father, who had just been elected Commissioner (Mayor) of Piti, was killed by Marcelo "Mar" C. Biscoe in 1956 when Cruz was five years old.

In 1960, while in Guam, Cruz's mother married Vicente Cruz Guerrero ("Tico"). They resettled the whole family in California in 1962.They returned to Guam intermittently, where Cruz attended grade school at St. Francis School in Yona.

He went to St. John Bosco High School in California until 1968. His bachelor's degree political science and economics was obtained in 1972 from the Claremont Men's College, and his Juris Doctor in 1975 from the Santa Clara University School of Law.

Career
Upon graduation in 1975, Cruz returned to Guam to work as Consumer Counsel in the Attorney General's Office.

Four months later, Governor of Guam Ricardo J. Bordallo, who had just begun his first term in office with Lieutenant Governor of Guam Rudy Sablan, asked Cruz to serve as the Governor's Legal Counsel, which he did for Bordallo's first term through January 1979.

Between Bordallo's two gubernatorial terms, Cruz established a private practice and served as Minority Legal Counsel to the 15th and 16th Guam Legislatures. In 1983, Governor Bordallo was elected to his second term as Governor of Guam with Lt. Governor Edward Diego Reyes. Bordallo appointed Cruz to head the Washington, D.C., Liaison Office. There, he served as Liaison to the White House, the United States Congress, and the National Governors Association.

In 1984, Bordallo appointed Cruz to be a Judge of the Superior Court of Guam. At 33, Cruz would be one of the youngest attorneys ever appointed to be a judge. His appointment was controversial, and several leaders of local Protestant churches testified against the confirmation, citing sexual preference as disqualifying Cruz from being a good judge. Despite these interventions, Cruz was confirmed by the legislature and began a 17-year career in the island judiciary.

Cruz spent the first nine of his seventeen years as a Superior Court Judge with the Family court, where he was an advocate for establishing and improving services for juvenile offenders and troubled youth. As a trial court judge, Cruz presided over the controversial lawsuit filed regarding the implementation of the Chamorro Land Trust Act. He issued the landmark decision ordering the Act's implementation.

In 1997, Governor Carl T.C. Gutierrez appointed Cruz to serve as an Associate Justice of the Supreme Court of Guam. He served as Associate Justice until 1999, when his colleagues elected him Chief Justice. Cruz served as Chief Justice from April 21, 1999, until August 31, 2001, when he retired from the judiciary.

Prior to his appointment as Superior Court judge, Cruz held key positions in the Democratic Party of Guam. He served as executive director under Franklin J.A. Quitugua and was Guam National Committeeman in the Democratic National Committee. Cruz returned to politics after his retirement from the judiciary in 2002, to chair the successful campaign of Congresswoman Madeleine Z. Bordallo. Between 2003 and 2005, Cruz once again served as Democratic National Committeeman.

In 2003, Cruz was appointed by U.S. Department of Interior Secretary Gale Norton to be one of five members of the Guam War Claims Review Commission, established by the Congress to report and make findings relative to compensation for the victims and survivors of the Japanese occupation of Guam during World War II. The Federal Commission has issued a report to Congress recommending compensation. A bill is now pending in the Congress that, when passed, will finally compensate victims and survivors.

Gutierrez-Cruz campaign (2006)
In 2004, Cruz was elected to the 28th Guam Legislature and was the highest democratic vote getter. In 2006, Cruz ran for Lt. Governor with Former Governor Carl T.C. Gutierrez in the 2006 Democratic primary against former Delegate Robert A. Underwood and Senator Frank Aguon. The Underwood-Aguon ticket won the primary but lost in the general election to Republican Governor Felix Perez Camacho and Lt. Governor Michael Cruz.

Vice-Speaker of the Guam Legislature
On January 7, 2008, Cruz was the victor in a special election to fill a vacancy in the 29th Guam Legislature left by the unexpected passing of former republican Speaker Antonio (Tony) R. Unpingco. The election of Cruz shifted the majority of the 15-seat At-large Legislature from the Republican Party to the Democratic Party.

In July 2008, Cruz worked to convince Navy Rear Admiral William French, Commander of the U.S. Naval Forces Marianas and other U.S. Navy officials to ease restrictions on the access of local veterans to the island's only VA Clinic located in a gated Naval hospital facility.

In 2009, Cruz introduced Same-sex Civil Union Legislation on behalf of the Guam Youth Congress. The legislation has been publicly opposed by Archbishop Anthony S. Apuron, Archdiocese of Hagatna, Guam. In July 2009, Cruz revised the legislation to provide for Domestic Partnerships between any two people. This legislation has also been opposed by the Catholic Church on Guam. Apuron has called for fasting and prayer for the Guam Legislature to reject the legislation.

Personal life
Cruz's nomination to be a Judge in the Superior Court of Guam in 1984 was marked with protests from evangelical and Baptist church groups because he was gay. Cruz was later confirmed as a judge and was assigned to lead the Family Court for nearly ten years. Cruz revealed a longstanding homosexual relationship in a local article published in Latte Magazine in 1995. Cruz eventually became Chief Justice of the Supreme Court of Guam and was featured in an article in The Advocate about his homosexuality.

See also 
 List of LGBT jurists in the United States

References

External links
 Senator BJ Cruz' Official Website
 Profile on Supreme Court of Guam website

|-

1951 births
20th-century American politicians
21st-century American politicians
Chamorro people
Chief Justices of the Supreme Court of Guam
Claremont McKenna College alumni
Gay politicians
Guamanian Democrats
Guamanian judges
Guamanian lawyers
Guamanian people of Spanish descent
LGBT judges
LGBT legislators in the United States
Guamanian LGBT people
Living people
Members of the Legislature of Guam
Santa Clara University School of Law alumni
Speakers of the Legislature of Guam
Justices of the Supreme Court of Guam
21st-century LGBT people